Zainab Cobbold (born Lady Evelyn Murray; 17 July 1867 – January 1963) was a Scottish diarist, traveller and noblewoman who was known for her conversion to Islam in the Victorian era.

Biography
Born in Edinburgh in 1867, she was the eldest daughter of Charles Adolphus Murray, 7th Earl of Dunmore and Lady Gertrude Coke, daughter of the Second Earl of Leicester. She married John Dupuis Cobbold in All Saints' Church Cairo, Egypt on 23 April 1891. Following a party in May 1891, at the Cobbold family home Holywells, Ipswich, they settled there. Here the couple had three children between 1893 and 1900: Winifred Evelyn (1892–1965), Ivan Cobbold (1897–1944), and Pamela Cobbold (1900–1932). However, in 1922 she separated from her husband. Subsequently she lived in London and on the Glencarron Estate.

Childhood
Cobbold spent much of her childhood in Algiers and Cairo in the company of Muslim nannies. She considered herself a Muslim from a young age despite not officially professing her faith until she met the Pope. She became a Mayfair socialite. She spent her childhood winters in North Africa where her fascination with Islam developed.

Conversion to Islam
She confirmed her conversion to Islam by 1915, taking the Arabic name Zainab. She remarked that she considered Islam the religion "most calculated to solve the world's many perplexing problems, and to bring to humanity peace and happiness".

Pilgrimage to Mecca
Following the death of her former husband in 1929, she started to plan her pilgrimage, or Hajj to Mecca. She contacted Hafiz Wahba, ambassador for the Kingdom of Hejaz and Nejd to the United Kingdom, who in turn sent a letter to King ‘Abd al-‘Aziz.

Evelyn achieved celebrity status in 1933 at the age of 65, when she became the first Muslim woman born in the United Kingdom to perform the pilgrimage to Mecca. In 1934, a personal account of her trip was published with the title Pilgrimage to Mecca. There is an excerpt from her work  in Michael Wolfe's book One Thousand Roads to Mecca.

She visited Italy with a friend and went to see the Pope who asked her if she was Catholic. Although she had never thought about Islam for years she replied by saying she was Muslim. After that she decided to read up more about Islam and eventually converted.

In 1933, she travelled to perform the Hajj for the first time, and because there were Europeans who visited Saudi Arabia before her and who were not Muslim penetrated into Mecca and when returning to Europe, they wrote about their daring adventure of performing the Hajj as a non-Muslim. Because of this there were restrictions in place for Europeans, but Lady Evelyn, who adopted the name Zainab, was granted permission to perform the Hajj.

Diary
This is her description in her diary of the first time she saw the Kabah and tawaf:

“We walk on the smooth marble towards the Holy of Holies, the House of Allah, the great black cube rising in simple majesty, the goal for which millions have forfeited their lives and yet more millions have found heaven in beholding it … the ‘Tawaf’ is a symbol, to use the words of the poet, of a lover making a circuit round the house of his beloved, completely surrendering himself and sacrificing all his interests for the sake of the Beloved. It is in that spirit of self-surrender that the pilgrim makes the ‘Tawaf’”.

Her book Pilgrimage to Mecca in 1934 is the first Hajj account by a Scottish Woman and her diary also is the oldest record of a trip during the Hajj, when she went by car from Mina to Arafat.  She travelled widely all her life and also wrote another book, Kenya: Land of Illusion.

During the world wars the Muslims who fought for Britain were spending and praying their Eid prayer in Woking Mosque; she was amongst some of the aristocrats in the iconic Eid prayer picture at Woking Mosque.  She was heavily involved in Dawah like William Quilliam and other noble English men and women of the time.

She was a fluent Arabic speaker and claimed she had been Muslim all her life and there was no intrinsic moment she converted.

Writing
"Islam," Evelyn later wrote, "is the religion of common sense."  Lady Evelyn's story about her life, her conversion and her pilgrimage to Mecca are all recorded in her diaries which have recently been republished.

"She was a very lively, eccentric Anglo-Scot Moslem, who loved doing things and loved people as well," Major Philip Hope-Cobbold, her great grandson said about her.

Death
Lady Evelyn died in 1963 and was buried, as she stipulated, on a remote hillside on her Glencarron estate in Wester Ross.  There was no Muslim in Scotland to perform her janazah so they contacted Woking Mosque and the Imam drove up in the snow to perform her janazah because she had stipulated she wanted to be buried on a hill on her estate facing Mecca with the following words on her gravestone:  "Allahu nur-us-samawati wal ard"  ("Allah is the light of the heavens and the earth"). 

In 2022 her grave was visited by a party of pilgrims from the Convert Islam Foundation, a British organisation for converts to Islam, who walked the  round trip up Gleann Fhiodhaig from a car-park off the A 890 in Glen Carron. The 2019 novel Bird Summons by Leila Aboulela (W&N) describes a pilgrimage by three Muslim women in search of Cobbold's grave.

References

Further reading
Clive Hodges: Cobbold & Kin: Life Stories from an East Anglian Family (Woodbridge, Boydell Press, 2014) 

1867 births
1963 deaths
Daughters of Scottish earls
Converts to Islam from Catholicism
British Muslims
Hajj accounts
Zainab
Scottish Muslims
Scottish diarists
British explorers